In the closet may refer to:

 Closeted, a label for lesbian, gay, bisexual, and transgender (LGBT) people who choose not to or have yet to come out of the closet, i.e. disclose their sexual orientation or gender identity, regardless of how they self-identify
 Nicodemite, a person with a hidden religious affiliation 
 Protestants pretending to be Catholic, known as Crypto-Protestantism
 Hiding aspects of one's identity, known as "passing"
 Skeleton in the closet (or "cupboard"), a reference to an undisclosed fact or activity from one's past that might have a negative impact on one's public image

Arts and entertainment
 "In the Closet", a 1991 song by Michael Jackson
 In the Closet, a 2008 gay-themed short film directed by Jody Wheeler starring Brent Corrigan and J. T. Tepnapa
 Trapped in the Closet, an urban opera or "hip-hopera" by R. Kelly from 2005
 "Trapped in the Closet" (South Park), a 2005 episode of South Park
 Monster in the Closet, a 1986 horror/comedy from Troma Entertainment
 Monsters in the Closet (Swollen Members album), a 2002 compilation album
 "Keg in the Closet", a 2004 song by country music singer Kenny Chesney
 Skeletons in the Closet (Oingo Boingo album), a 1989 compilation album
 Skeletons in the Closet (Gamma Ray album), a 2003 live album
 R&B Skeletons in the Closet, a 1986 album by George Clinton

See also
 The Closet (disambiguation)
 Closet (disambiguation)